Athletics or track and field will be among the sports to be contested at the 2019 South Asian Games. Athletics will be hosted in the Dasarath Stadium. This stadium will also host the games' Opening and Closing Ceremony.

Hassan Saaid of the Maldives, won his country's first ever South Asian Games gold medal. Sri Lanka topped the medal count, winning a total of 15 gold medals, marking the first time since the 1993 games where the country has topped the athletics medal table.

Medal summary
 Note : Medal Table needs to be Updated after Doping Test Results

Medal table

Men's events

Women's events

See also 
 Doping at the 2019 South Asian Games

References

2019 South Asian Games
2019
South Asian Games
Events at the 2019 South Asian Games